Martin Paasoja (born 4 January 1993) is an Estonian professional basketball player for ÍR of the Úrvalsdeild karla. He is a 1.91 m (6 ft 3 in) tall shooting guard. He also represents the Estonian national basketball team internationally.

Professional career
In September 2022, Paasoja signed with ÍR of the Úrvalsdeild karla.

Estonian national team
Paasoja was a member of the junior Estonian national team that finished 15th in the 2012 FIBA Europe Under-20 Championship and 19th in the 2013 FIBA Europe Under-20 Championship.

Career statistics

Domestic leagues

Estonia national team

|-
| style="text-align:left;"| 2010
| style="text-align:left;"| 2010 FIBA Europe Under-18 Championship Division B
| style="text-align:left;"| Estonia U-18
| 8 || 0 || 13.4 || .489 || .125 || .538 || 2.0 || .4 || 1.1 || .5 || 6.9
|-
| style="text-align:left;"| 2011
| style="text-align:left;"| 2011 FIBA Europe Under-18 Championship Division B
| style="text-align:left;"| Estonia U-18
| 3 || 1 || 22.7 || .125 || .000 || .667 || 2.7 || 3.0 || 1.3 || .0 || 2.0
|-
| style="text-align:left;"| 2012
| style="text-align:left;"| 2012 FIBA Europe Under-20 Championship
| style="text-align:left;"| Estonia U-20
| 9 || 5 || 28.4 || .424 || .270 || .733 || 6.2 || 1.2 || 1.0 || .0 || 11.7
|-
| style="text-align:left;"| 2013
| style="text-align:left;"| 2013 FIBA Europe Under-20 Championship
| style="text-align:left;"| Estonia U-20
| 9 || 8 || 28.5 || .350 || .319 || .567 || 5.3 || 1.2 || 2.2 || .4 || 11.3
|-
| style="text-align:left;"| 2015
| style="text-align:left;"| 2015 Summer Universiade
| style="text-align:left;"| Estonia Universiade
| 7 ||  || 14.0 || .258 || .083 || .800 || 1.7 || .3 || .6 || .0 || 3.0
|-
| style="text-align:left;"| 2016
| style="text-align:left;"| EuroBasket 2017 Qualification
| style="text-align:left;"| Estonia
| 6 || 0 || 6.5 || .444 || .000 || 1.000 || .8 || .5 || .2 ||.2 || 1.7
|-
| style="text-align:left;"| 2017
| style="text-align:left;"| 2019 Basketball World Cup Pre-Qualifiers
| style="text-align:left;"| Estonia
| 4 || 2 || 17.6 || .571 || .333 || .571 || 2.8 || 2.2 || .6 || .0 || 5.5
|-
| style="text-align:left;"| 2017–19
| style="text-align:left;"| 2019 Basketball World Cup Qualification
| style="text-align:left;"| Estonia
| 11 || 6 || 15.3 || .488 || .286 || .600 || 1.5 || 1.0 || .9 || .1 || 5.5

References

External links
 Martin Paasoja at basket.ee 
 Martin Paasoja at fiba.com

1993 births
Living people
Estonian expatriate basketball people in Greece
Estonian expatriate basketball people in Romania
Estonian men's basketball players
ÍR men's basketball players
KK Pärnu players
Korvpalli Meistriliiga players
Rapla KK players
BC Kalev/Cramo players
Shooting guards
Úrvalsdeild karla (basketball) players
Estonian expatriate basketball people in Iceland
People from Kärdla